Hrpelje-Kozina railway station is a railway station in the Municipality of Hrpelje-Kozina, Littoral, Slovenia. The station lies on the Divaca-Koper railway. The train services are operated by SZ.

Train services
The station is served by the following service(s):

 Intercity: Maribor - Pragersko - Poljcane - Sentjur - Celje - Lasko - Zidani Most - Trbovlje - Zagorje - Litija - Ljubljana - Borovnica - Rakek - Postojna - Pivka - Divaca - Hrpelje-Kozina - Koper
 Intercity: Ljubljana - Borovnica - Logatec - Rakek - Postojna - Pivka - Divaca - Hrpelje-Kozina - Koper
 Regionalni vlak (Regional train): Ljubljana - Ljubljana Tivoli - Brezovica - Notranje Gorice - Preserje - Borovnica - Verd - Logatec - Planina - Rakek - Postojna - Pivka - Kosana - Gornje Lezece - Divaca - Rodik - Hrpelje-Kozina - Presnica - Koper
 Regionalni vlak (Regional train): (Sezana - Povir -) Divaca - Rodik - Hrpelje-Kozina - Presnica - Crnotice - Hrastovlje - Koper
 Regionalni vlak (Regional train): Divaca - Rodik - Hrpelje-Kozina - Presnica - Podgorje - Zazid - Rakitovec

External links 
Official site of the Slovenian railways (in English)
The station
The station

Railway stations in Slovenia